The Summer of High Hopes is the tenth album by Emm Gryner, released in 2006 on Dead Daisy Records.

In an interview with Q Magazine, Bono cited Gryner's "Almighty Love" as one of the songs he most wished he had written himself.

Copies preordered through Gryner's website were shipped with a bonus disc, PVT, which featured rerecorded versions of songs from her 1998 album Public. This disc was later offered as a separate purchase.

Track listing
 "Girls are Murder" – 4:23
 "Merlot" – 3:30
 "All-Time Low" – 2:56
 "Almighty Love" – 3:53
 "Blackwinged Bird" – 4:21
 "Black-Eyed Blue Sky" – 2:22
 "Queen of the Boys" – 3:33
 "Starcrossed" – 3:56
 "See the Sea" – 2:26
 "Sunshine" – 3:18
 "Sweet Destroyer" – 4:58

References 

2006 albums
Emm Gryner albums